Hydroxycarboxylic acids are carboxylic acids containing one or more hydroxy (alcohol) functional groups.  They are of particular interest because several are bioactive and some are useful precursors to polyesters.
The inventory is large.

Important or common examples
Glycolic acid, precursor to laquers
Hydroxypropionic acids, e.g.,  (lactic acid), component of milk
Hydroxybutyric acids,  (beta-Hydroxybutyric acid), carbon-storage compound
Citric acid, energy-carrying compound and iron-chelator
Salicylic acid, precursor to aspirin
Ricinoleic acid (12-hydroxy-9-cis-octadecenoic acid)), a major component of the seed oil obtained from castor plant
Tyrosine, a common amino acid

Subclasses
Classes of hydroxycarboxylic acid are named by where the hydroxy group is on the carbon chain relative to the carboxylic group. 
Alpha hydroxy acid
Beta hydroxy acid
Omega hydroxy acid

See also
Hydroxycarboxylic acid receptor

References

Hydroxy acids